The Officina Profumo-Farmaceutica di Santa Maria Novella is a perfumery and herbalist shop in Florence, in Tuscany in central Italy. It is not a pharmacy and does not sell medicines, but is sometimes described as "the oldest pharmacy in the world". 

Its origins can be traced back to the Dominican monastery of Santa Maria Novella and the mediaeval medicines created by the monks. A retail operation was established in Via Reginaldo Giuliani in 1612 by Fra Angiolo Marchissi, becoming famous over the coming centuries for the quality and salubrious benefits of its products, ranging from perfumes, pot pourri and toiletries, to liqueurs, medicinal balms, and foods. It remained in the ownership of the Church of Santa Maria Novella until 1866, when the property was confiscated by the Kingdom of Italy and sold to a private owner. Since the 1990s Santa Maria Novella's retail operations have expanded rapidly to include locations in every major Italian city, and 75 shops throughout the world, in countries including the United States, Panama, Japan, South Korea, Australia, and South Africa.

History 

The Church of Santa Maria Novella and its monastery were established in 1221 outside the city gates of Florence. The monks began experimenting with herbs and flowers grown in the monastic garden, creating soothing balms, elixirs, and other medicaments. By 1381 an on-site infirmary was in operation, where the monks' products were used for treating themselves and Florentine patients. One of the products developed about this time was a distilled rose water intended to treat the plague, at the height of the Black Death. Another medicament produced by the monks, called Vinegar of the Seven Thieves (Aceto dei Sette Ladri), gained its name and reputation during the Black Death because of a rumor that a band of 7 corpse robbers would douse themselves in it to protect against disease.

Powerful scented waters were developed in medieval times including "Santa Maria Novella Water" and digestive aids like lozenges (Pasticche di Santa Maria Novella). Santa Maria Novella Water and the lozenges both employed the healing herb Tanacetum balsamita, known as Balsamite or Costmary, as a key ingredient. In the 16th century a special type of incense was invented: Armenian Paper (Carta D'Armenia), which was infused with spices and resin to perfume the room while the paper burned without flame.  By the mid 16th century the pharmacy's widespread fame induced the monks to offer their products for sale to the public for the first time. The shop expanded its product range, developing curative tonics and perfumes including Acqua della Regina, a fragrance specially designed for Catherine de Medici, Queen of France, the pharmacy's most important patron. Acqua della Regina was given to Catherine before her departure for France in 1533, and was the first perfume to use an alcohol base, rather than the traditional vinegar or olive oil. Through Queen Catherine's patronage of Santa Maria Novella, their products were introduced to the French court, where perfume hadn't previously been used. Although successful, anxieties over the commercialization of the monastery's remedies caused the closure of the business during the first decade of the 17th century. By 1612, the business had resumed operations and a shop was opened to the public on Via della Scala. In 1659, the Officine received the title of His Royal Highness' Foundry (Fonderia Granducale) from Ferdinando II de' Medici, Grand Duke of Tuscany, placing it under the protection of the Medici family.

In 1749, one of the Officine's apothecaries, Fra' Cosimo Bucelli, codified Santa Maria Novella's extensive recipes in a book, "I segreti della Fonderia di Sua Altezza Reale" ("The Secrets of the Foundry of His Royal Highness"). It was Bucelli who developed the foundry's famous alcoholic liqueur, Alchermes, made from sugar, nutmeg, cinnamon and cloves (its deep scarlet color is obtained through dried and crushed ladybugs).
 During the 17th century, Santa Maria Novella would turn its attention increasingly to developing new liqueurs, which had medicinal applications. Alchermes, for instance, was given to new mothers to aid their recovery from giving birth, while another famous liqueur, Elisir di China, contained quinine and was intended to treat malaria. By 1700 Santa Maria Novella had become famous all over Europe; the Sala Verde or Green Room hosted visitors who came to enjoy the pharmacy's most famous concoction, made from Alchermes, Elisir di China, and chocolate syrup. In 1866 the property of the Church of Santa Maria Novella was confiscated by the Italian state, and the pharmacy passed into the ownership of Cesare Augusto Stefani, the nephew of the monastery's last director, Damiano Beni.
In 2012 to celebrate the 400th anniversary of the Officina a celebratory Stamp has been issued by Poste Italiane,  part of the Made in Italy series. The Pharmacy celebrated the event producing two Limited Edition perfumes.

Modern operations 

Santa Maria Novella continues to inhabit its historic premises on Via della Scala in Florence, around the corner from the Church of Santa Maria Novella, but since 2000 the production facilities have been housed in a factory two miles north. Since the 1990s, the focus has been placed on expanding output and markets for Santa Maria Novella products, while at the same time preserving the traditional, artisanal methods of production and high-quality ingredients. Objects such as soaps are cooled, wrapped, and ventilated for 30 days on wooden racks before they are chiseled and molded by hand for sale. Over 500 bars of soap are produced in this way each day, with 25 separate varieties available.

The premises on the Via della Scala in Florence houses several historic sales rooms, a tea room, and a museum and library dedicated to the history of the pharmacy. An average of 2,000 visitors per day visit the shop. The main sales room occupies a former chapel, with allegorical frescoes of the four continents painted by Paolino Sarti decorating the vaulted ceilings. The old sacristy is decorated with frescoes by the early-Renaissance artist Mariotto di Nardo, painted in 1380. The Green Room houses displays of wax products, room fragrances, accessories, and men's grooming products. The Old Pharmacy (Antica Spezieria) displays the full range of medicaments and elixirs, foods including biscuits, chocolate, tea, and honey, and the pharmacy's famous liqueurs like Alchermes and Liquore Mediceo. The museum and its exhibits are housed in the Old Laboratories of the Via della Scala premises, containing ceramic and earthenware jars from the 16th and 17th centuries, historic soap machines, and traditional tools. The library is housed in the old sacristy of the church, and includes medieval recipe and reference books.

References 

Privately held companies of Italy
1612 establishments in Italy
Pharmaceutical companies of Italy
Companies based in Florence
World records